Parlin Field  is a public use airport in Sullivan County, New Hampshire, United States. It is owned by the Town of Newport and located two nautical miles (3.74 km) north of its central business district. It is included in the Federal Aviation Administration (FAA) National Plan of Integrated Airport Systems for 2017–2021, in which it is categorized as a local general aviation facility.

Although most U.S. airports use the same three-letter location identifier for the FAA and IATA, this airport is assigned 2B3 by the FAA, but has the designation NWH from the IATA.

Facilities and aircraft 
It has two runways: 18/36 with an asphalt surface measuring 3,450 by 50 feet (1,052 x 15 m) and 12/30 with a turf surface measuring 1,950 by 80 feet (594 x 24 m)

For the 12-month period ending August 31, 2008, the airport had 2,901 aircraft operations, an average of 8 per day: 100% general aviation with a few ultralights. At that time there were 23 aircraft based at this airport: 91% single-engine, 4% multi-engine and 4% ultralights.

References

External links 
 Aerial photo as of April 1998 from USGS The National Map via MSR Maps
 

Airports in New Hampshire
Transportation buildings and structures in Sullivan County, New Hampshire
Newport, New Hampshire